Zenonu (also, Zenoni) is a village and municipality in the Lerik Rayon of Azerbaijan.  It has a population of 459.

References 

Populated places in Lerik District